Alishar Hüyük (in modern Yozgat Province, Turkey) was an ancient Near Eastern city. It is near the modern village of Alişar, Sorgun.

History
Alishar Hüyük was occupied beginning in the Chalcolithic Period, through the Bronze Age and the Hittites, and into Phrygian times. A number of Hittite-era cuneiform tablets in Old Assyrian of the Cappadocia type were found there. Mention in those tablets of the town Amkuwa has caused speculation that the site is the Ankuwa mentioned in other Hittite texts.

Archaeology
The site was excavated between 1927 and 1932 by a team from the Oriental Institute of Chicago. The work was led by Erich Schmidt.

Excavation resumed in 1992, led by Ronald Gorny as part of
the Alisar Regional Project, though most of the work has been at nearby Çadır Höyük.

Çadır Höyük

About 12 km northwest of Alishar Huyuk, there's another important archaeological site named Cadir Hoyuk (Çadır Höyük in Turkish alphabet).

Recent excavators of Cadir Hoyuk have identified this site tentatively with the Hittite city of Zippalanda.

Notes

See also

 Cities of the ancient Near East

References
Branting, Scott A. "the alisar regional survey 1993-1994: a preliminary report" anatolica. annuaire international pour les civilisations de l'asie antérieure. nederlands instituut voor het nabije oosten, no. 22, pp. 145-159, 1996
Ronald L. Gorny, The Biconvex Seals of Alishar Höyük, Anatolian Studies, vol. 43, pp. 163–191, 1993
Gorny, R. L. etc.. "the alisar regional project 1994" anatolica. annuaire international pour les civilisations de l'asie antérieure. nederlands instituut voor het nabije oosten, no. 21, pp. 65-100, 1995
Ronald L. Gorny, Hittite Imperialism and Anti-Imperial Resistance As Viewed from Alișar Höyük, Bulletin of the American Schools of Oriental Research, no. 299/300, The Archaeology of Empire in Ancient Anatolia, pp. 65–89, 1995
Gorny, R. L. etc.. "the 1998 alisar regional project season" anatolica. annuaire international pour les civilisations de l'asie antérieure. nederlands instituut voor het nabije oosten, no. 25, pp. 149-185, 1999
Martino, Shannon. "New Considerations and Revelations regarding the Anthropomorphic Clay Figurines of Alişar Höyük" Anatolica. Annuaire international pour les civilisations de l'Asie antérieure. Publié sous les auspices de l'Institut historique et archéologique néerlandais à Istanbul, no. 40, pp. 111-155, 2014
Erich Schmidt, Anatolia Through the Ages: Discoveries at the Alishar Mound, 1927–1929, Oriental Institute Communication 11, University of Chicago Press, 1931
Snyder, Alison B. "re-constructing the anatolian village: revisiting alisar" anatolica. annuaire international pour les civilisations de l'asie antérieure. nederlands instituut voor het nabije oosten, no. 26, pp. 173-193, 2000

External links

The Turkish TAY project at Alişar Hüyuk.
Alishar Hüyük ceramics (French text)
Dig site for nearby Çadır Höyük
Anatolian Iron Age Ceramics Project - photo of the site

Archaeological sites in Central Anatolia
History of Yozgat Province
Geography of Yozgat Province